Silvestras Guogis (born 2 March 1990) is a Lithuanian 400 metres hurdler and sprinter.

He represented Lithuania in 2008 World Junior Championships in Athletics and 2007 World Youth Championships in Athletics without reaching the final.

Achievements

References

1990 births
Living people
Lithuanian male hurdlers
Lithuanian male sprinters